Transperth is the brand name of the public transport system serving the city and suburban areas of Perth, the state capital of Western Australia. It is managed by the Public Transport Authority (PTA), a state government organisation. Train operations are done by Transperth Train Operations, a division of the PTA. Bus operations are contracted out to Swan Transit, Path Transit and Transdev. Ferry operations are contracted out to Captain Cook Cruises.

History

In August 1986, the Metropolitan Transport Trust was rebranded as Transperth. In February 1995 the provision of ferry services was contracted to Captain Cook Cruises. In September 1993, the Government announced Transperth would be corporatised and opened up to competition. In February 1995 in preparation for privatisation, Transperth was restructured with the operation of services transferred to MetroBus, with ownership of the buses retained by Transperth.

In September 1994, expressions of interest were sought from organisations for the operation of Transperth bus services in the Armadale South and Joondalup North areas. MetroBus successfully bid to retain these services.

The remaining services were tendered in 1995/96 to Connex, Path Transit, Southern Coast Transit and Swan Transit. Connex sold its operation to Swan Transit in September 2002, before re-entering the market by purchasing Southern Coast Transit.

Transperth retained ownership of the buses leasing them to the operators. MetroBus did not win any further tenders and operated its last bus on 8 November 1998.

Livery

The Metropolitan Transport Trust adopted an olive green and cream livery. Following the 1986 rebranding as Transperth a green and white livery was introduced, this being replaced in 1999 by a grey/silver and green livery. This livery was inversed in 2010 as part of a refurbishment.

Services
Transperth offers bus, ferry and train services which currently serve the Perth Metropolitan Area from the Perth CBD, east to Wundowie, west to Fremantle, south to Mandurah-Pinjarra and north to Two Rocks. These suburbs are divided into nine fare-zones according to distance from the city centre.

Buses
All buses operated under Transperth are low-entry, wheelchair accessible, and air conditioned. Bus services in Perth are operated by three private companies with services divided into 11 zones that are re-tendered every 10 years. Since January 2020, the contracts were held by:
Path Transit: Kalamunda & Morley
Swan Transit: Canning, Claremont, Marmion, Midland, Southern River & Joondalup
Transdev WA: Fremantle, Rockingham & Perth CAT

2015 bus fires

As of September 2015, there have been a number of fires aboard the fleet's natural gas powered Mercedes-Benz OC 500 LEs. It was discovered that there were possible faults in the on-board fire suppression system installed in the engine compartment at the rear of the bus. A bus fire at the Elizabeth Quay bus station in July was said to have been caused by a leaking coolant cell. A series of one-off fires have occurred in two of the fleet's Mercedes-Benz O405NH diesel buses, both of which were sparked by frayed fan belts. Nobody was injured in any bus fires as the drivers were quick to respond and evacuate any passengers before the fires became lethal.

Special services

CircleRoute: The CircleRoute is a cross suburban route that links numerous railway stations, shopping centres, universities, schools and the port city of Fremantle. Services run 5–15 minutes weekdays and 15–30 minutes weekends and public holidays.

Central Area Transit: Transperth operates CAT bus services around the Perth, Fremantle and Joondalup CBDs. Services run every 5 – 15 minutes on weekdays and every 10 – 15 minutes on weekends.

Perth

Red CAT: Southern East Perth to West Perth
Yellow CAT: Northern East Perth to West Perth
Blue CAT: North to south
Green CAT: (Monday to Friday only) Leederville station to Elizabeth Quay bus station
Purple CAT: Elizabeth Quay bus station to University of Western Australia

Fremantle
Blue CAT: Southern Fremantle CBD and South Beach
The Red CAT is no longer operating.

Joondalup
The Blue and Red Joondalup CATs run Monday to Friday only. The Yellow CAT runs Monday to Thursday during ECU days.
Red CAT: CBD loop (anticlockwise)
Blue CAT: CBD loop (clockwise)
Yellow CAT: Edith Cowan University shuttle

Airport services
Transperth operates the Airport line from Perth station to High Wycombe station, via Perth Airport. Terminals 1 and 2 are also served by route 37 from Oats Street Station via Belmont Forum during weekdays day time only. Terminals 3 and 4 are serviced by route 292 from Redcliffe Station.

Ferries
Transperth operates a ferry service across the Swan River between Elizabeth Quay (Perth CBD) and the South Perth foreshore. Services depart twice an hour during winter and every 15 minutes during summer. The ferry is popular with commuters and tourists who use it to get to the Perth Zoo. There are currently three Transperth ferries: the MV Phillip Pendal, the MV Tricia, and the MV Shelley Taylor-Smith, which serves as a reserve vessel.The ferry service has been operated under contract by Captain Cook Cruises since February 1995.Merry Ferry Christmas Australasian Bus & Coach 4 December 2012. In the year ended June 2015, there were 400,000 passenger boardings on Perth ferry services.

Trains
Transperth Train Operations, a division of the PTA, operates Perth's urban rail services. The network consists of 73 railway stations on seven narrow-gauge lines to Midland, Armadale, Fremantle, Butler, High Wycombe and Mandurah. Trains to Thornlie run via a branch off the Armadale line.

Services operate from 05:00 until 00:00 (until 02:00 on Saturday and Sunday mornings) with a minimum frequency of 3–15 minutes until 19:30 and 30 minutes until midnight, 15 minutes weekday and weekend (including public holidays). Post midnight services on Saturday and Sunday mornings operate on one-hour frequency until 02:15. In the year ended June 2015, 64.2 million passenger journeys were made on the network, up from 31.1 million in 2003–04.

The network has been served exclusively by electric multiple unit railcars since it was electrified in the 1990s. Before that diesel locomotive-hauled trains and ADK/ADB and ADL/ADC diesel multiple units were used.

 Rolling stock 

Passenger information

My Account
Introduced in 2003 as TravelEasy before rebranding to My Account in 2014–15, My Account is an online account for Transperth passengers to manage their SmartRider, parking registration, and travel alert services.

My SmartRider is the portal that allows passengers using SmartRiders to register their SmartRiders and directly manage their cards. Functions available include viewing card balance and fare type, SmartRider Autoload management, manage bike shelter access, SmartParker management, and the transaction history.

My SmartParker is the portal for passengers who park their cars at train stations to register their cars in order to use their SmartRider to pay for parking.

My Alerts is the service which My Account users can register for in order to receive alerts about upcoming works, changes and disruptions on their nominated services. These notifications are distributed via email. Advance notice is given for permanent changes and planned disruptions, with unplanned disruptions typically only being notified if they are significant (such as long delays or non-trivial peak hour delays).

Google transit
Perth became the first city in Australia to use Google transit, whereby all bus stops, railway stations and ferry wharfs have a clickable symbol on Google Maps which reveals the next departures from that stop. Public transport is also available as an option for Google Maps' directions feature.

Live train times
As of 10 December 2009, the TravelEasy users can view the live train times to see whether the train services is on time or not as well as live departure times. This service has now been made available to all commuters, and a cut-down version has been placed on 136213.mobi.

136213.MOBI
The 136213.MOBI service was launched on 10 June 2008. The service allows for public transport information, such as upcoming departures, service changes and SmartRider balances, to be obtained on a WAP-compatible mobile phone.

Ticketing

The ticketing system used on the network has been updated as technology has advanced, with the current options available to passengers being cash tickets from ticket vending machines at railway stations, a ferry wharf, or bus driver or by using their SmartRider, a re-loadable stored-value card.

The Transperth network is separated into 9 fare zones plus a "Free Transit Zone" in the Perth CBD, with fares being calculated based on number the of zones crossed at either standard or concession rates, with SmartRiders taking a 10% discount, increasing to 20% with the Autoload feature active. Additionally, SmartRider users have their daily fare capped at the price of the DayRider special fare. Due to a fare cap introduced on 1 January 2022, fares for each trip are limited to 2 zones, with the effect that the ordinary fares available are 2 section, 1 zone, and 2 zones. In addition to these ordinary fares, there are several special fares available.

The special fare classes and concessions include:

Previous methods
In the early 1990s, the network changed over from the use of train conductors with old rotary paper ticketing units and installed self-service ticket vending machines supplied by Ascom. The same rotary units in place on buses were replaced with technology supplied by Wayfarer Transit Systems.

Also at the same time, an upgraded version of the pre-encoded multi-trip ticket system MultiRider was introduced, also relying on technology from Wayfarer.

Controversies
 August 2014: A bus driver was fired for "screaming" at a teenage boy after he accidentally pressed the "stop button" too early by accident. The bus driver was said to have suddenly stopped the bus and forced the boy off the bus on an isolated stretch of road in Perth's southeastern suburbs.
 February 2016: A bus driver refused to give a young girl a ride from Whitfords after she was unable to use her SmartRider as she ran out of credit, instead forced to pay the 80 cent fare. Despite efforts from fellow passengers to pay the fare, the bus driver forced her to walk to Whitfords railway station and drove off.
 February 2016: A bus driver was fired after a Byford grandmother was "dragged" behind an Armadale bus service. When the doors closed, her arm became trapped. Afterward, the bus driver moved off, but only stopped when passengers intervened. The bus driver did not apologise to the woman, nor offer assistance.

Changes

In March 2007, the Public Transport Authority commenced a trial of upgraded ticket vending machines installing two new units on the Eastern concourse at Perth railway station and all Mandurah railway line stations.

These trial units are based on touch-screen technology, and provide an expanded number of options including being able to purchase multiple quantities of tickets at the same time, as well as optionally being able to pay using either notes or electronic funds transfer from a cheque or savings account using a debit card, dependent on these components being installed in the unit. These are now installed in all railway stations in place of the older ticketing vending machines. They were made by and contracted out to Xerox who won the bid to change out the fare system.

In 2007, the MultiRider ticketing system was replaced with the SmartRider ticketing system which uses contactless electronic ticketing system using smartcard technology for the process of charging patrons for public transport.

The SmartRider is a smartcard incorporating a microchip and internal aerial, allowing the smartcard to communicate with processors located on Transperth buses and ferries and at railway stations. The microchip enables value to be loaded onto the card, as well as allowing the journey details to be recorded and the appropriate fare deducted from the stored value on the card. The card is able to pay for bus, ferry or train travel and can also be used at some Pay 'n' Display railway station car parks to pay for parking. In a system which Transperth calls "SmartParker", the user can register their car's registration plate and pay for parking by swiping the card at a payment machine on the way from the car park to the station: such payment is now valid for 24 hours.

It is also used to authenticate access to the Lock 'n' Ride secure bicycle storage areas at some stations.

Free Transit Zone
Perth has a Free Transit Zone (FTZ) with travel free on buses in the central business district. The FTZ funded by an annual levy on non-residential parking bays in Perth, East Perth, West Perth and Northbridge.

On the rail network, however, free travel within the zone is only available to passengers who have purchased a SmartRider card. This was not always the case, but is now required due to changes in station structures brought about by the implementation of the SmartRider ticketing system.

Proposals

Light rail

In September 2012, the government announced that construction would begin in 2016 on a new Perth light rail network, to be known as Metro Area Express'' (MAX). The first stage of the MAX network was to run from the Polytechnic West campus in Balga, in Perth's northern suburbs, to the Perth CBD, with spur lines from the CBD to the Queen Elizabeth II Medical Centre in Nedlands and The Causeway in East Perth. Construction of the first stage was scheduled to be completed by the end of 2018. In December 2013 the government deferred a decision on whether to build the line, with it cancelled in 2016.

Future expansions under Metronet

Prior to the 2017 Western Australian state election, the then-opposition Labor Party promised a large expansion to Perth's rail network under the title Metronet. After the comprehensive victory by Labor, the Mark McGowan government established Metronet as an agency of the Public Transport Authority to oversee a number of projects to expand and improve the network. Projects in stage one include:

Forrestfield–Airport Link
In August 2014, the government announced the 8.5 km Forrestfield–Airport Link would be constructed providing a service to Perth Airport and Forrestfield. Construction commenced officially in November 2016, with the line due to open in the first half of 2022. After almost 6 years of construction, the line has finished testing and building, soon commencing train services from the CBD via the Midland Line on 9 October 2022.

Morley–Ellenbrook Line
A link to Ellenbrook had been originally promised by then-Premier Alan Carpenter and Opposition Leader Colin Barnett prior to the 2008 elections, however this proposal was not realised. Mark McGowan revived the project in 2017. A business case is currently being prepared for a new 21 km Ellenbrook spur line with stations at Morley, North Morley (Dianella), Noranda, Malaga, Bennett Springs, Whiteman and Ellenbrook. Construction work is expected to start in 2019 and be completed in 2022.

Thornlie–Cockburn Link 
Perth's first east–west rail link is planned to run between Thornlie and Cockburn Central stations, connecting the Mandurah and Thornlie lines. This proposal involves 14.5 km of new railway, relocating 11 km of freight line and building two new stations, construction started in 2019.

Joondalup rail extension to Yanchep 
The Yanchep Rail Extension is a 14.5 km project to extend the Joondalup line North for 14.5 km with stations at Alkimos, Eglinton and Yanchep. The extension is set to start construction in 2019. The Yanchep Rail Extension and the Thornlie-Cockburn Link are slated to have a combined cost of $1.1 billion.

Other Metronet projects

 Extending Armadale line services to Byford.
 Extending Midland line services to Bellevue and relocating Midland station.
 Building Karnup station. on the Mandurah line.
 Removing several level crossings on the Armadale and Midland lines
 Designing and manufacturing 41 (246 carriages) new six-car C-series trains

Publications
In July 1969, the MTT launched MTT Quarterly as a staff newsletter. It was rebranded Transperth Magazine in July 1987.

See also
List of bus routes in Perth, Western Australia
List of Transperth bus stations
List of Transperth railway stations
New MetroRail – second rail network expansion project
Northern Suburbs Transit System – rail network expansion project from the late 1980s
Transwa – also run by the Public Transport Authority, controls public transport in Western Australia, outside Perth

References

External links

Public transport in Perth, Western Australia
Transport companies established in 1958
Australian companies established in 1958